The 2013 Cooper Challenger was a professional tennis tournament played on outdoor clay courts. It was the 6th edition of the tournament and part of the 2013 ITF Women's Circuit, offering a total of $50,000 in prize money. It took place in Waterloo, Canada between July 1 and July 7, 2013. It was the final edition of the tournament.

Singles main draw entrants

Seeds

1 Rankings are as of June 24, 2013

Other entrants
The following players received wildcards into the singles main draw:
 Sandra Dynka
 Gloria Liang
 Jillian O'Neill
 Charlotte Petrick

The following players received entry from the qualifying draw:
 Jacqueline Crawford
 Marie-Alexandre Leduc
 Kyle McPhillips
 Wendy Zhang

Champions

Singles

 Julia Glushko def.  Gabriela Dabrowski, 6–1, 6–3

Doubles

 Gabriela Dabrowski /  Sharon Fichman def.  Misa Eguchi /  Eri Hozumi, 7–6(8–6), 6–3

External links
Official website

2013 ITF Women's Circuit
Waterloo Challenger
Cooper Challenger
Cooper Challenger